Martin Kobras (born 19 June 1986) is an Austrian football goalkeeper for FC Rotenberg.

Club career
Up to the winter break of the 2010–11 season of the Austrian second-tier Erste Liga, Kobras had not missed a minute for his club.

In early 2022, Kobras moved to FC Rotenberg in the third-tier Eliteliga Vorarlberg.

References

1986 births
Living people
SC Rheindorf Altach players
SK Sturm Graz players
Austrian footballers
People from Bregenz
2. Liga (Austria) players
Austrian Football Bundesliga players
Austrian Landesliga players
Association football goalkeepers
Footballers from Vorarlberg